Fernando Vázquez Sánchez (born 3 March 1999) is a Mexican footballer who plays as a forward.

References

External links
 

Mexican footballers
Living people
Footballers from Guadalajara, Jalisco
1999 births
Association football forwards
Alebrijes de Oaxaca players
Ascenso MX players
Liga de Expansión MX players